A CITF form 40 is the form the United States' military's Criminal Investigation Task Force (CITF) uses to record "investigative activity", including interviews with suspects.
A memo to all personnel of the CITF, dated 16 December 2002, intended to lay out the procedures for interrogating captive apprehended in the war on terror, stated:
{| class="wikitable"
| 
Interview Documentation Requirement: All interrogations will be documented on a CITF Form 40 that will include the ISN of the detainee, time and date of the interrogation, duration of the interrogation and either the identities or organizations of all persons present for the interrogation. Form 40's will be only be drafted and signed by personnel who actively participated in the interview and can serve as a witness to the detainee's statements. All CITF personnel participating in the interview must be documented appropriately in the case file, either in the investigative notes or on the Form 40. Where appropriate, participation by non-CITF personnel in the interview should also be reflected in the Form 40. 
|}

References

Guantanamo Bay captives legal and administrative procedures